Our Lady of Czestochowa Parish - designated for Polish immigrants in Coventry, Rhode Island (Former Quidnick village), United States.

Founded in 1905, it is one of the Polish-American Roman Catholic parishes in New England in the Diocese of Providence.

History 
In 1905, the Bishop of the Diocese of Providence Matthew Harkins sent Father Francis Kluger to organize the parish. On October 22, 1905, Fr. Francis Kluger began celebrating Mass in the basement of St. John's Church.
The first pastor, Fr. John M. Nowicki arrived in Quidnick on November 2, 1906.

The Gothic style edifice of the church with a seating capacity of 400 was completed in the spring of 1907. As an expression of their great love and devotion to the Mother of God, the Polish immigrants named the church Our Lady of Czestochowa, in honor of Mary's most famous shrine in Poland.  The church was blessed and dedicated by Bishop Harkins on April 21, 1907. Fr. Franciszek Chalupka of Webster, Massachusetts, was also present at this solemn occasion.

Pastors 
 Rev. John M. Nowicki (1905-1907)
 Rev. Michael Dutkiewicz (1907-1914)
 Rev. Lawrence Malecki (1914-1917)
 Rev. Kluger (1917-1921)
 Rev. J. Olechnowicz (1921-1922)
 Rev. Bronislaus S. Rosiak (1922-1934)
 Rev. Joseph J. Glodzik (1934-1948)
 Rev. Peter Narewski (1948-1950)
 Rev. John T. Borek (1950-1955)
 Rev. Anthony D. lwuc (1955-1972)
 Rev. Peter Narewski (1972-1986)
 Rev. Czesław Leon Kachel (1986-1989)
 Rev. Kenneth J. Suibielski (1989-1990)
 Rev. John D. Dreher (1990-1999)
 Rev. Stephen P. Amaral (1999-2017)
 Rev. Jacek Ploch (2017–present)

See also
 Catholic Church in the United States
 Catholic parish church
 Pastoral care
 Index of Catholic Church articles

References

Bibliography 
 
 
 
 The Official Catholic Directory in USA

External links 
 Official site of the Holy See
 Our Lady of Czestochowa - Diocesan information
 Our Lady of Czestochowa - ParishesOnline.com

Churches in the Roman Catholic Diocese of Providence
Polish-American culture in Rhode Island
Polish-American Roman Catholic parishes in New England
Churches in Kent County, Rhode Island